Billy Boles (April 30, 1927 – August 16, 2008) was an American lawyer and politician. He served as a Democratic member of the Louisiana State Senate.

Life and career 
Boles was born in Rayville, Louisiana. He attended the University of Louisiana at Monroe, Louisiana Tech University and Louisiana State University.

In 1952, Boles was elected to the Louisiana State Senate, succeeding Ralph E. King. He served until 1956, when he was succeeded by King. In 2004, he was inducted into the Louisiana Political Museum and Hall of Fame.

Boles died in August 2008, at the age of 81.

References 

1927 births
2008 deaths
People from Rayville, Louisiana
Democratic Party Louisiana state senators
20th-century American politicians
Louisiana lawyers
University of Louisiana at Monroe alumni
Louisiana Tech University alumni
Louisiana State University alumni